Kevin McConway (born 12 October 1950) is emeritus professor of applied statistics at the Open University, where he spent most of his career. He was the first Vice President (Academic Affairs) of the Royal Statistical Society, from 2012-2016. He was academic adviser to the BBC Radio Four programme More or Less and has written about that experience. He is currently a trustee and advisory board member of the Science Media Centre and has written about experience communicating statistics with the media, and this is developed as general guidance, and to statisticians specifically - "remember to sound human".

References

External links 
https://www.battleofideas.org.uk/2017/speaker/kevin-mcconway/
https://www.open.edu/openlearn/profiles/kjm2

Academics of the Open University
Alumni of the University of Cambridge
Alumni of University College London
Alumni of the Open University
1950 births
Living people